NK Novigrad is a Croatian association football club founded in 1947 and based in the town of Novigrad in Istria County. It currently plays in the Croatian Third Football League.

Honours 
 Treća HNL – West:
Winners (1): 2015–16

External links
NK Novigrad (Soccerway) 

Association football clubs established in 1947
Football clubs in Croatia
Football clubs in Istria County
1947 establishments in Croatia